Great Jazz Standards is an album by jazz composer, arranger, conductor and pianist Gil Evans recorded in 1959 by Evans with an orchestra featuring Johnny Coles, Steve Lacy, Curtis Fuller, Jimmy Cleveland, Budd Johnson, Ray Crawford, and Elvin Jones.

Reception
The Allmusic review by Scott Yanow awarded the album 4 stars calling it "Highly recommended".

Track listing
 "Davenport Blues" (Bix Beiderbecke) - 4:26
 "Straight, No Chaser" (Thelonious Monk) - 6:19
 "Ballad of the Sad Young Men" (Fran Landesman, Tommy Wolf) - 4:00
 "Joy Spring" (Clifford Brown) - 2:48
 "Django" (John Lewis) - 8:06
 "Chant Of The Weed" (Don Redman) - 4:25
 "La Nevada" [a.k.a. "Theme"] (Gil Evans) - 6:17

Recorded on February 5, 1959 (tracks 3, 4, 6 & 7) and early 1959 (tracks 1, 2 & 5)

Personnel
Gil Evans - piano, arranger, conductor
Johnny Coles, Louis Mucci, Allen Smith (tracks 1, 2 & 5), Danny Stiles (tracks 3, 4, 6 & 7) - trumpet
Curtis Fuller, Bill Elton, Dick Lieb (tracks 1, 2 & 5), Jimmy Cleveland, Rod Levitt (tracks 3, 4, 6 & 7) - trombone
Bob Northern (tracks 1, 2 & 5), Earl Chapin (tracks 3, 4, 6 & 7) - french horn
Bill Barber - tuba
Steve Lacy - soprano saxophone
Budd Johnson - clarinet, tenor saxophone (tracks 3, 4, 6 & 7)
Al Block (tracks 1, 2 & 5), Ed Caine (tracks 3, 4, 6 & 7) - reeds
Chuck Wayne (tracks 1, 2 & 5), Ray Crawford (tracks 3, 4, 6 & 7) - guitar
Dick Carter (tracks 1, 2 & 5), Tommy Potter (tracks 3, 4, 6 & 7) - bass
Denis Charles (tracks 1, 2 & 5), Elvin Jones (tracks 3, 4, 6 & 7) - drums

References

1959 albums
World Pacific Records albums
Gil Evans albums
Albums arranged by Gil Evans
Albums produced by Richard Bock (producer)
Albums conducted by Gil Evans